The Dolomitenlauf is a cross-country skiing marathon in Austria. It has been held since 1970 and has been part of Worldloppet as long as Worldloppet has been around.

References

External links

Official website

1970 establishments in Austria
January sporting events
Recurring sporting events established in 1970
Ski marathons
Cross-country skiing competitions in Austria
East Tyrol